Mount Arcone is a horseshoe-shaped mountain rising to 1350 m in Nash Range, Churchill Mountains. It stands at the east side of Dickey Glacier, 7 nautical miles (13 km) north of Mount Canopus. Named by Advisory Committee on Antarctic Names (US-ACAN) after Steven A. Arcone, U.S. Army Cold Regions Research and Engineering Laboratory (CRREL), who conducted ground radar traverses and airborne radar surveys in the South Pole area, Transantarctic Mountains, and ice sheet of West Antarctica during six field seasons, 1993–2002.

Mountains of the Ross Dependency
Shackleton Coast